The Rugby League Cup is a New Zealand rugby league trophy that is contested between districts on a challenge basis. The trophy used to be known as the Northern Union Challenge Cup.

It is the oldest rugby league competition in New Zealand.

History

New Zealand rugby league was born with events such as the All Golds tour of England, and matches in Wellington and Auckland in 1908. John Coffey writes in Te Ara, "The Auckland Rugby League was formed in July 1909, and North Shore played City as the forerunner to an inter-club competition that started in 1910. By this time, league was also being played in Taranaki, Rotorua, Hawke’s Bay, Nelson, Marlborough and Southland."

The Cup was made in Bradford and donated to Auckland for inter-provincial competition by the touring 1910 Great Britain Lions.

The Cup was first contested in 1911, when Auckland successfully defended it four times. The Cup was held by Auckland until 1922.

Auckland are the current holders of the Cup after they defeated Canterbury in a one-off match on 4 June 2012. This was marked as a "centennial" match.

Past winners

Year by year

See also

References

External links

Rugby league competitions in New Zealand